The F20C and F22C1 were inline-4 engines produced by Honda for use in the Honda S2000. They are one of the few Honda 4-cylinder automobile engines that are designed to sit longitudinally for rear wheel drive.

These engines are a distant relative to the F-series engines found in the mid-1990s Honda Accord and Prelude. To get most out of the compact-sized engine, Honda engineers utilized technology derived from Honda's racing engines. The F20C and F22C1 have two overhead cams with roller followers, a ladder-frame main bearing stiffener, a VTEC system for both the intake and exhaust camshaft, Fiber-Reinforced Metal cylinder liners (FRM), molybdenum disulfide-coated piston skirts for reduced friction, and uses a timing chain.

The VTEC system consists of two separate cam lobe profiles. Variable cam phasing is not used. Roller followers are used to reduce friction in the valvetrain. The rocker arms are constructed using metal injection molding.

The engine block is constructed of aluminum with a fiber-reinforced metal sleeve. A timing chain drives an intermediate gear, which drives the cams. The pistons are forged aluminum. The intake plenum was designed with minimal volume for fast engine response, and a  flywheel was fitted until 2004. A high-flow catalyst is supplied along with an exhaust air-injection system, which greatly decreases catalyst light-off time and cold emissions.

F20C
Rod Length: 153 mm (approximately 6.024 in)
Rod/stroke ratio: approximately 1.8214:1
Power:
JDM  at 8,600 rpm &  at 7,500 rpm
USDM  at 8,300 rpm;   at 7,500 rpm
Rev limit: 9,000 rpm 
VTEC actuates between 5,500-6,000 rpm depending on ECU triggers.

The F20C was designed with high engine speed capability in mind, for increased power output; the rev limit is 9,000 rpm, with VTEC engagement at 6,000 rpm. Its relatively long stroke of 84 mm results in a mean piston speed of 4,965 ft/m, or 25.2 m/s, which was higher than any other production car to date. Honda's F20C Engine won a spot on Wards' 10 Best Engines List twice, in 2000 and 2001.

The engine displaces , lending to the Honda S2000's name. This method of naming follows suit with the rest of the Honda S roadsters (i.e. Honda S500, S600, and S800).

Applications:
 1999-2005 Honda S2000 (Japan)
 2000-2003 Honda S2000 (North America)
 1999–2009 Honda S2000 (United Kingdom, Europe, Australia)
2009 IFR Aspid
2009 Skelta G-Force

Honda's F20C engine held the record for producing the highest specific power output for any mass production naturally aspirated piston engine, at 123.5 HP/L, until Ferrari began production of the 458 Italia in 2010, which produced 124.5 HP/L.

Although designed at the end of the previous century, the F20C is still one of the highest output per liter and the highest revving mass production engines ever made. In recognition of its incredible power output, the Honda S2000's engine has won the International Engine of the Year category for 1.8 to 2.2-liter engines five times in its lifetime (from 2000 to 2004).

F22C1
Rod Length: 149.65 mm (approximately 5.892 in)
Rod/stroke ratio: approximately 1.6499:1
Power:
Rev limit: 8,200 rpm
VTEC: "6,000 rpm" 

Dubbed the F22C1, it was originally designed for the North American market being introduced for the 2004 model year. The redline was reduced from 8,900 rpm to 8,200 rpm, mandated by the longer travel distance of the pistons. Peak horsepower output was originally rated identical to the F20C, with "overall powerband characteristics strengthened 4% to 10% between 1,000 -8,000 rpm".

The F22C1 was used exclusively in the North American market for 2004 and 2005 with the F20C being used in all other markets. Outside Japan and the United States, the F20C continued to be the only available engine.

Applications:
 2004–2009 Honda S2000 (F22C1) (North America)
 2006–2009 Honda S2000 (Japan)

See also
 List of Honda engines
 Listen to a F20C in operation:

References

External links
 http://www.honda.co.jp/HOT/ModelData/s2000/index.html

F engine
Straight-four engines
Gasoline engines by model